Gabrielle Vernier (born 12 June, 1997) is a French rugby union player who plays for Blagnac SCR and the France women's national rugby union team.

Early life
Vernier started playing aged 10 for Rueil Athletic Club before playing for Racing Club Nanterre. She then moved north to Lille to continue her studies.

Career
Vernier won the French championships with Lille MRCV in 2016. She made her French debut on November 11, 2017 against Spain. In 2021 she was voted Women’s Six Nations Player of Round 1. She was named in France's team for the delayed 2021 Rugby World Cup in New Zealand. She started their opening game, a 40-5 victory over South Africa and played register throughout the tournament, scoring a try in the French semi-final defeat to hosts New Zealand.

References

1997 births
Living people
French female rugby union players